Castrisch railway station is a railway station on the Reichenau-Tamins–Disentis/Mustér railway of the Rhaetian Railway in the Swiss canton of Graubünden. It serves the village of Castrisch in the municipality of Ilanz/Glion.

Services
The following services stop at Castrisch:

Gallery

References

External links 
 
 

Railway stations in Switzerland opened in 1903
Railway stations in Graubünden
Rhaetian Railway stations